Cerberus Falls is a segmented horsetail waterfall located at the head of Icefall Canyon in the Continental Ranges of British Columbia, Canada. It is also the tallest waterfall in Canada by tallest single drop and the 26th tallest waterfall in the world by tallest single drop.

Structure
Cerberus Falls forms as Icefall Brook emerges from the Southwest Lyell Glaciers and cascade over the edge of a glacially scoured trough. The falls form two to four distinct segments depending on seasonal melt. During high flow, three of the four segments appear grouped close together while the fourth appears further to the southwest.

The southernmost segment plunges in three massive steps. The middle segment skips down the cliff in one long horsetail. The northernmost segment plunges down into a narrow slot canyon before reemerging as a veiling horsetail near the base of the cliff.

See also
James Bruce Falls

References

Canadian Rockies
Waterfalls of British Columbia
Kootenay Land District